The Jerusalem District is one of the six administrative districts of Israel. The district capital is Jerusalem. The Jerusalem District has a land area of 652 km2. The population of 1,159,900 is 66.3% Jewish and 32.1% Arab. A fifth (21%) of the Arabs in Israel live in the Jerusalem Municipality, which includes both East and West Jerusalem. Israel's annexation of East Jerusalem has not been recognized by the international community.

The majority of Arabs in the Jerusalem District are Palestinians, eligible to apply for citizenship under Israeli law, but either declining to apply or unsuccessful. The minority are Arab citizens of Israel living in Abu Ghosh, Beit Safafa and East Jerusalem, where palestinians have settled since the late bronze age , mainly for the provision of legal and other services to the local population. The non-Jewish population is 95.2% Muslim, 3.5% Christian with the others unclassified by religion.

Administrative local authorities

Notes

The Jerusalem Municipality, including East Jerusalem and other annexed parts of the West Bank, constituted with 125 km² about 19% of the Jerusalem District in 2008.

See also
 Jerusalem Governorate
 List of cities in Israel
 Arab localities in Israel
 Positions on Jerusalem
 Timeline of Jerusalem
 Elah Valley
 Judean Mountains

References

 
Year of establishment missing
District